ATCO Records is an American record label founded in 1955. It is owned by Warner Music Group and operates as an imprint of Atlantic Records. After several decades of dormancy and infrequent activity under alternating Warner Music labels, the company was relaunched by Atlantic Records in early 2020.

History

1950s–1960s: Beginnings
ATCO Records was devised as an outlet for productions by one of Atlantic Records' founders, Herb Abramson, who had returned to the company from military service. The label was also intended as a home for acts that did not fit the format of the main Atlantic brand, which was releasing blues, jazz, rhythm and blues and soul. The ATCO name is an abbreviation of ATlantic COrporation. ATCO also provided distribution for other labels, including RSO, Volt, Island, Modern, Ruthless, Hansa and Rolling Stones. For most of its history, ATCO was known for pop and rock music, but during its early years, it produced some jazz albums. These included Harry Arnold, Betty Carter, King Curtis, Herb Geller, Roland Hanna, and Helen Merrill.

ATCO's rock era began with Bobby Darin and The Coasters. In the early 1960s, Atlantic began to license material from international sources, leading to instrumental hit singles from Jorgen Ingmann, Acker Bilk and Bent Fabric. Starting in the mid-1960s, ATCO moved into rock-and-roll with Sonny and Cher, Buffalo Springfield, Vanilla Fudge, Iron Butterfly and Cream (the latter under license from British label Polydor).

In 1964, ATCO released a single in the US by The Beatles, "Ain't She Sweet" (flip side "Nobody's Child", with lead singer Tony Sheridan), which had been recorded in Hamburg in 1961. With lead vocals by John Lennon, "Ain't She Sweet" reached No. 19 on the Billboard Hot 100 chart in August 1964. ATCO also released an album entitled Ain't She Sweet which featured the other two tracks by Sheridan and The Beatles from the Hamburg session and filled out by eight other songs covered by The Swallows.

In 1966, ATCO released "Substitute" by The Who. The song was issued through an arrangement with UK Polydor Records because of the dispute The Who was having with their producer, Shel Talmy, and their contract with US Decca Records and UK Brunswick Records. This would be the only Who recording to appear on ATCO, although Pete Townshend and John Entwistle would eventually sign to ATCO as solo artists, and Roger Daltrey later signed a US solo deal with Atlantic. This release differs from the UK release with a different structure/edit (the break comes in after the first verse vs. second), a substitute lyric (“I try walking forward but my feet walk back” in place of “I look all white but my dad was black”).

1970s–1980s: Downsizing 
During the 1970s, Atlantic Records began to broaden the range of its own roster, causing ATCO to become deemphasized as many of its acts would eventually have their material released under the main Atlantic brand. In the middle 1970s, ATCO became increasingly used for hard rock acts and some British and European bands. During this time, the label issued early albums from AC/DC. Starting in 1978, however, AC/DC releases were issued on Atlantic until their contract with the label ended in the 1990s. In 1980, ATCO's visibility rose with strong chart performances from Pete Townshend's Empty Glass album and the song "Cars" by Gary Numan. As the 1980s wore on, ATCO continued to have streamlined success with artists such as Sweet Sensation, JJ Fad and Michel'le (the latter who were signed to the label in conjunction with Ruthless Records), while steadily becoming less active overall.

1990s: Merger with EastWest Records America and dormancy
The last number one hit on ATCO was "If Wishes Came True" by Sweet Sensation in 1990. The following year, Atlantic Records Senior VP Sylvia Rhone orchestrated the merger of ATCO with Atlantic's fledgling EastWest Records America label and briefly operated the combination as Atco/EastWest Records. By 1994, however, the ATCO name was dropped and the label reverted to the EastWest Records America branding. During this time, EastWest moved its operations to Atlantic's sister label Elektra Records. As a result of Elektra's takeover of EastWest, ATCO's back catalog and retained artists were now under its control. In the decade to come, the ATCO name and logo would be occasionally used on reissues of past material, but the imprint itself was now dormant.

2000s: Revival under Rhino Entertainment
In 2005, after more than a decade in hibernation, ATCO (in a joint venture with Rhino Records) released the soundtrack of the Bobby Darin biopic Beyond the Sea, which starred Kevin Spacey and featured his renditions of Darin's songs. This led to Warner Music Group reactivating the label in 2006 in conjunction with Rhino. Scarlett Johansson, Keith Sweat and Art Garfunkel were among the first artists signed to the label. Garfunkel issued Some Enchanted Evening on January 30, 2007. Johansson issued Anywhere I Lay My Head on May 20, 2008. Queensrÿche released its American Soldier album on ATCO on March 31, 2009. The New York Dolls released its album Cause I Sez So on ATCO on May 5, 2009. Shortly thereafter, ATCO would become dormant again.

2020s: Return to Atlantic Records and second relaunch
In 2020, ATCO returned to the aegis of Atlantic Records, where it was relaunched. On February 14, Billboard Magazine announced that Atlantic Records President of A&R Pete Ganbarg was appointed president of the newly relaunched ATCO Records. Ganbarg's first ATCO signing is Philadelphia-based alternative act Zero 9:36.

Roster
The following is a list of artists who have recorded for ATCO Records.

 AC/DC (outside Australia)
 Airrace
 Allman Brothers Band (Capricorn/Atco)
 Andy Williams
 Steve Arrington
 Back Street Crawler
 Barrabás
 The Beatles (US)
 Bad Company
 Badger
 Ginger Baker (including Ginger Baker's Air Force and Baker Gurvitz Army) (US/Canada)
 Jeff Beck
 Bee Gees (US/Canada)
 Chuck Berry
 Mr Acker Bilk (US/Canada)
 Black Oak Arkansas
 Blackfoot
 Blind Faith (US/Canada)
 Blue Mountain Eagle
 Blue Magic
 Blues Image
 Sonny Bono (as "Sonny")
 Brooklyn Brothers
 Jack Bruce (US/Canada)
 Buffalo Springfield
 Cactus
 The Capitols
 Jim Carroll
 Change
 Cher
 Corina
 Eric Clapton (US/Canada)
 The Coasters
 Cold Grits
 Natalie Cole (Modern/Atco) 
 Arthur Conley
 Cream (US/Canada)
 Cross Country
 Bobby Darin
 Spencer Davis Group (US/Canada)
 Delaney & Bonnie and Friends
 Diesel
 The D.O.C. (Ruthless/Atco)
 Dr. John
 Dream Theater
 Julie Driscoll, Brian Auger & The Trinity
 Dave Edmunds
 Jonathan Edwards (Capricorn/Atco)
 Eight Seconds
 Electric Boys
 Enuff Z'Nuff
 Envy
 John Entwistle
 Bent Fabric and his Piano
 Scott Fagan
 Gary Farr
 Fat Mattress
 Fatback
 The Fireballs
 Tricia Leigh Fisher
 Flies on Fire
 Focus (US/Canada)
 The Fourmost
 Peter Gabriel (US/Canada)
 Art Garfunkel
 Genesis (US/Canada)
 Gregory Gray
 R. B. Greaves
 Tim Hardin
 Gordon Haskell
 Donny Hathaway
 Hawkwind
 Horslips (US)
 Humble Pie
 Steve Hunter
 Jorgen Ingmann
 INXS (US/Canada)
 Iron Butterfly
 Deon Jackson (Carla)
 James Gang
 J. J. Fad (Ruthless/Atco)
 Robbin Julien
 Scarlett Johansson
 Juicy Lucy
 Michael Kamen
 Ben E. King
 King Curtis
 Last Words
 Bettye LaVette
 Lime (Critique/Atco)
 Lindisfarne (US/Canada)
 Loudness
 Lulu
 Manowar
 Penny McLean
 Michel'le (Ruthless/Atco)
 Gary Moore (Mirage/Atco) (US)
 New York Dolls
 New York Rock & Roll Ensemble
 Stevie Nicks (Modern/Atco) (US/Canada)
 Nina & Frederik (US/Canada)
 Gary Numan (US/Canada)
 Outlaw Blood
 Pantera
 Pat & The Satellites
 The Persuaders
 Pleasure Bombs
 Queensrÿche
 The Raindogs
 Otis Redding
 Ann Richards
 Bob Rivers (Critique/Atco)
 The Robins
 The Rose Garden
 Rebel Heels (Atco Aus) 
 Rowan & Martin
 Roxy Music (US/Canada)
 Shadows Of Knight (Dunwich/Atco)
 Shannon (Mirage/Atco)
 The Sherbs
 Kym Sims
 Slave
 P. F. Sloan
 Sonny & Cher
 Southside Johnny & the Jukes (Mirage/Atco)
 Keith Sweat
 Sweet Sensation
 The System (Mirage/Atco)
 Taffy
 Tangier
 Livingston Taylor (Capricorn/Atco)
 Nino Tempo & April Stevens
 Nolan Thomas (Mirage/Atco)
 Pete Townshend (US/Canada)
 The Troggs
 Vandenberg
 Vanilla Fudge
 Jerry Jeff Walker
 Dee Dee Warwick
 Stevie Wright (US/Canada)
 Yes
 Yomo & Maulkie (Ruthless/Atco)

References

External links
 
 Atlantic Records website
 Discography of ATCO LP releases

Record labels established in 1955
Warner Music labels
American record labels
Atlantic Records
Progressive rock record labels
Rock record labels
Heavy metal record labels
Labels distributed by Warner Music Group
Entertainment companies established in 1955
Jazz record labels
American companies established in 1955